Division is the sixth studio album by Japanese visual kei rock band The Gazette, released on August 29, 2012, in Japan by Sony Music Records, and released on October 1, 2012, in Europe by JPU Records as the label's first release. It is a double album, the first disk containing alternative metal and nu metal songs and the second disk containing industrial metal songs in the limited edition, including 14 songs, the first CD has mostly Japanese titled tracks, while the second CD has only English  titled tracks, and a DVD with the promotional videos "Ibitsu" and "Derangement" each disc (including the DVD) has their own name. The regular edition includes 12 songs.
Is the first release that does not include promotional singles since their sixth EP Gama.

A Japanese tour, called Live Tour12 -Division- Groan of Diplosomia 01, to promote the album, was held on October 8, 2012, at the Yokosuka Arts Theatre and finished on November 29, 2012, at the NHK Hall with a total of 24 performances.

The second part of the tour called Live Tour13 -Division- Groan of Diplosomia 02 with a total of 6 performances began on February 2, 2013, and finished in the final concert Melt on Saitama Super Arena.
A DVD was released with recorded live footage of the Melt concert on June 26, 2013.

The album scored number 3 on the Oricon Daily Charts and number 4 on the Oricon Weekly Charts, selling 23,051 copies in its first week.

Track listing

Limited Edition

Regular Edition

References

External links
 PS Company Official Website
 Sony Music Entertainment Japan Official Website

2012 albums
The Gazette (band) albums